Asca microsoma is a species of mite in the family Ascidae.

References

Further reading

 

microsoma
Articles created by Qbugbot
Animals described in 1996
Taxa named by Wolfgang Karg